Hippodamia sinuata, the sinuate lady beetle, is a species of lady beetle in the family Coccinellidae. It is found in North America and Oceania.

Subspecies
These six subspecies belong to the species Hippodamia sinuata:
 Hippodamia sinuata albertana Casey
 Hippodamia sinuata crotchi Casey, 1899
 Hippodamia sinuata disjuncta Timberlake
 Hippodamia sinuata sinuata Mulsant, 1850
 Hippodamia sinuata spuria LeConte, 1861
 Hippodamia sinuata straminea Chapin

References

Further reading

 

Coccinellidae
Articles created by Qbugbot
Beetles described in 1850